Nemanja is a masculine Serbian given name.
It is derived from the by-name borne by the founder of the Nemanjić dynasty, Stefan Nemanja (1114–1199), a Serbian grand prince who was venerated as a saint after his death. 

Etymologically, many think the name most likely derives from a meaning "without possessions",  from Serbian nemati "to have not", but that is not true. The name origins from ne manuti "not to let go" in terms of being persistent.

Modern given name
In Serbia, the name rose to popularity in the 1980s. Between 2003 and 2005, the name was 9th most popular name given to newly-born boys. 

Nemanja Aleksandrov (b. 1987), Serbian basketball player
Nemanja Bezbradica (b. 1993), Serbian basketball player
Nemanja Bilbija (b. 1990), Bosnian footballer
Nemanja Bjelica (b. 1988), Serbian basketball player
Nemanja Čorović (b. 1975), Serbian footballer
Nemanja Dangubić (b. 1993), Serbian basketball player
Nemanja Dimitrijević (b. 1992), Serbian paralympian athlete
Nemanja Glavčić (born 1997), Serbian footballer
Nemanja Gordić (b. 1988), Bosnian basketball player
Nemanja Gudelj (b. 1991), Serbian footballer
Nemanja Ilić (b. 1990), Serbian handball player
Nemanja Isakovic (nexa) (b. 1997), Serbian Counter-Strike: Global Offensive player
Nemanja Jovanović (b. 1984), Serbian footballer
Nemanja Kojić (footballer) (b. 1990), Serbian footballer
Nemanja Kovač (huNter-) (b. 1996), Bosnian-Serbian Counter-Strike: Global Offensive player
Nemanja Krstić (b. 1993), Serbian basketball player
Nemanja Majdov (b. 1996), Serbian judoka
Nemanja Maksimović (born 1995), Serbian footballer
Nemanja Matić (b. 1988), Serbian footballer
Nemanja Mijušković (born 1992), Montenegrin footballer
Nemanja Miljković (1990–2020), Serbian basketball player
Nemanja Milisavljević (b. 1984), Serbian footballer
Nemanja Mirosavljev (b. 1970), Serbian shooter
Nemanja Mladenović (b. 1994), Serbian handball player
Nemanja Nedović (b. 1991), Serbian basketball player
Nemanja Nikolić (footballer born 1987), Serbian footballer
Nemanja Nikolić (footballer born 1988), Montenegrin footballer
Nemanja Obradović (b. 1991), Serbian handball player
Nemanja Obrić (b. 1984), Serbian footballer
Nemanja Pavlović (b. 1977), Serbian footballer
Nemanja Pejčinović (born 1987), Serbian footballer
Nemanja Pribak (b. 1984), Serbian-Macedonian handball player
Nemanja Radoja (born 1993), Serbian footballer
Nemanja Radonjić (b. 1996), Serbian footballer
Nemanja Radulović (b. 1985), Serbian violinist
Nemanja Rnić (b. 1984), Serbian footballer
Nemanja Stevanović (born 1992), Serbian footballer
Nemanja Tenjović (b. 1985), Serbian prominent Political Scientist
Nemanja Tomić (b. 1988), Serbian footballer
Nemanja Vidić (b. 1981), Serbian footballer
Nemanja Vuković (b. 1984), Montenegrin footballer
Nemanja Zelenović (b. 1990), Serbian handball player

See also
 Slavic names

References

External links
 http://www.behindthename.com/name/nemanja
 http://www.babynamespedia.com/meaning/Nemanja

Slavic masculine given names
Montenegrin masculine given names
Serbian masculine given names